Baronissi is a town and comune in the province of Salerno in the Campania region of south-western Italy. It is home to a campus of the University of Salerno.

History 
The town develops from the original old area named Casali.

Geography 
The town is situated 7 km north of Salerno and it is 35 km from Avellino.  The bordering municipalities are Castiglione del Genovesi, Cava de' Tirreni, Fisciano, Mercato San Severino, Pellezzano and Salerno.

Its 11 hamlets (frazioni) are Acquamela, Aiello, Antessano, Capo Saragnano, Caprecano, Casal Barone, Casal Siniscalco, Fusara, Orignano, Saragnano, Sava (the most populated one).

Main sights

Convent of the Holy Trinity, 13th century
Villa Farina, 19th century
Roman villa of Sava, 1st century AD
Church of the Holy Savior, in Saragnano

Transport
The municipality has two train stations (Baronissi, in town's center, and Acquamela, in the homonym village), both on the line Salermo-Mercato San Severino. It is also served by the motorway RA 2 Salerno-Avellino, at the exits "Baronissi Sud" and "Lancusi-Baronissi Nord".

Events 
Baronissi Jazz Festival: it takes place every July since 1996 in the "Anfiteatro" (Amphitheater), a modern hemicycle built in the mid-nineties and located in the hamlet of Sava near the border with the town of Baronissi. His guests included the French pianist Michel Petrucciani.
Irno Comix & Games: takes place since 2016 and is a 2-day comic fair with the participation of exhibition stands, designers and cosplayers, the latter engaged in the traditional "Cosplay Competition" which takes place on the second day of the fair. Held at the Parco della Rinascita (Renaissance Park). The winter edition takes place in Salerno, in Villa Carrara.

Personalities
Diego Campanile (1574–1642), Catholic Guardian of Holy Land
Fortunato Maria Farina (1881–1954), Catholic Archbishop
Jack Hirschman (b. 1933) American poet,

Twin towns 
 Portes-lès-Valence - France (2006)

Notes and references

External links 

 Official website of Baronissi
 Valle dell'Irno website

Cities and towns in Campania